Cindy Wright is an artist who was born in Herentals, Belgium on November 29, 1972.  She earned a Master in the Visual Arts (painting) from the Royal Academy of Fine Arts (Antwerp) in 1996 and a laureate at the Higher Institute for Fine Arts, Antwerp in 2006.  She currently lives and works in Antwerp.

She is best known for her large-scale paintings with a macabre twist, often described as photorealism.  Untitled (Self-portrait) from 2008, in the collection of the Honolulu Museum of Art, demonstrates the artist's gritty, non-idealized style. The Frederick R. Weisman Art Foundation (Los Angeles), the Het Museum van Elsene (Brussels, Belgium), the Honolulu Museum of Art, the Las Vegas Art Museum, the Madison Museum of Contemporary Art (Madison, Wisconsin), the Museum of Contemporary Art San Diego (California), and the Royal Academy of Fine Arts (Antwerp) are among the public collections holding work by Cindy Wright.

Bibliography
 Lumpkin, Libby, Cindy Wright, Paintings 2004-2006, Las Vegas Art Museum, 2006.
 Mark Moore Gallery, Cindy Wright, Antwerp, Mark Moore Gallery, 2009.

Footnotes

External links
 
 Cindy Wright in AskArt.com

1972 births
American women painters
Photorealist artists
People from Herentals
Living people
20th-century American painters
20th-century Belgian painters
20th-century American women artists
21st-century American painters
21st-century Belgian painters
21st-century American women artists
Royal Academy of Fine Arts (Antwerp) alumni